Penns Grove is a borough in Salem County, in the U.S. state of New Jersey. As of the 2020 United States census, the borough's population was 4,837, a decrease of 310 (−6.0%) from the 2010 census count of 5,147, which in turn reflected an increase of 261 (+5.3%) from the 4,886 counted in the 2000 census.

Penns Grove had the fourth-highest property tax rate in New Jersey, with an equalized rate of 5.556% in 2020, compared to 3.476% in Salem County and a statewide average of 2.279%.

History
The area was long primarily agricultural. Penns Grove was incorporated as a borough by an act of the New Jersey Legislature on March 8, 1894, from portions of Upper Penns Neck Township (now Carneys Point Township), based on the results of a referendum held two days earlier. It began to industrialize around this time. The borough's name comes from William Penn.

In the early 20th century, many Italian immigrants from Valle San Giovanni and the surrounding southern province of Teramo came to work at the local E.I. DuPont de Nemours plant in Carneys Point. Many settled on Pitman Street in Penns Grove. In 1925, the Italian community arranged to commission a copy of the statue of the Madonna and Child from the Chiesa della Madonna delle Grazie in Teramo, and had it installed in the Saint James Roman Catholic Church in Penns Grove. Other immigrants from eastern Europe also settled in the county, markedly increasing the population.

Also in the 20th century, the area became a destination for Black Americans in the Great Migration who came north for industrial jobs. Some Black Americans in the area were descended from slave families from the colonial and early federal period. Since the late 20th century, new immigrants have arrived from Central and South America, an increasing Latino minority.

Geography
According to the United States Census Bureau, Penns Grove borough had a total area of 0.89 square miles (2.31 km2), all of which was land.

The borough borders Carneys Point Township and the Delaware River.

Demographics

2010 census

The Census Bureau's 2006–2010 American Community Survey showed that (in 2010 inflation-adjusted dollars) median household income was $30,104 (with a margin of error of +/− $9,093) and the median family income was $37,663 (+/− $9,442). Males had a median income of $42,908 (+/− $8,706) versus $30,353 (+/− $5,538) for females. The per capita income for the borough was $15,785 (+/− $2,169). About 28.1% of families and 28.2% of the population were below the poverty line, including 41.2% of those under age 18 and 15.8% of those age 65 or over.

2000 census
As of the 2000 United States census there were 4,886 people, 1,827 households, and 1,231 families residing in the borough. The racial makeup of the borough was 48.85% White, 39.75% African American, 0.37% Native American, 0.29% Asian, 0.16% Pacific Islander, 8.13% from other races, and 2.46% from two or more races. Hispanic or Latino of any race were 17.29% of the population.

There were 1,827 households, out of which 38.4% had children under the age of 18 living with them, 34.6% were married couples living together, 27.5% had a female householder with no husband present, and 32.6% were non-families. 28.1% of all households were made up of individuals, and 13.0% had someone living alone who was 65 years of age or older. The average household size was 2.67 and the average family size was 3.26.

In the borough the population was spread out, with 33.0% under the age of 18, 8.9% from 18 to 24, 27.9% from 25 to 44, 18.5% from 45 to 64, and 11.8% who were 65 years of age or older. The median age was 31 years. For every 100 females, there were 85.5 males. For every 100 females age 18 and over, there were 79.6 males.

The median income for a household in the borough was $26,227, and the median income for a family was $34,076. Males had a median income of $30,871 versus $20,983 for females. The per capita income for the borough was $13,330. About 18.1% of families and 21.0% of the population were below the poverty line, including 29.1% of those under age 18 and 13.3% of those age 65 or over.

Government

Local government
Penns Grove is governed under the Borough form of New Jersey municipal government, which is used in 218 municipalities (of the 564) statewide, making it the most common form of government in New Jersey. The governing body is comprised of the Mayor and the Borough Council, with all positions elected at-large on a partisan basis as part of the November general election. The Mayor is elected directly by the voters to a four-year term of office. The Borough Council is comprised of six members elected to serve three-year terms on a staggered basis, with two seats coming up for election each year in a three-year cycle. The Borough form of government used by Penns Grove is a "weak mayor / strong council" government in which council members act as the legislative body with the mayor presiding at meetings and voting only in the event of a tie. The mayor can veto ordinances subject to an override by a two-thirds majority vote of the council. The mayor makes committee and liaison assignments for council members, and most appointments are made by the mayor with the advice and consent of the council.

, the Mayor of Penns Grove is Independent LaDaena D. Thomas, whose term of office ends December 31, 2023;; Thomas is the borough's first woman to serve as mayor and the county's first African-American woman to serve as a mayor. Members of the Borough Council are Council President Charlyn Martin (D, 2023), Jonathan Carter (D, 2023), Tracy Marinaro (D, 2025), John C. Rambo (R, 2024), Anjanette Scott (D, 2025) and Sonya Worley (D, 2024).

After losing his re-election campaign in November 2019, Carl J. Washington Jr. resigned from office from his seat that was about to expire and was then appointed to fill the seat expiring in December 2021 that had been held by Rafael Leon until he resigned from office.

In February 2014, the Borough Council selected Ulpiano Padilla and Deborah Scott from lists of names nominated by the Democratic municipal committee to fill the vacant seats of Darwin Coleman and Stephanie Stewart.

Federal, state and county representation
Penns Grove is located in the 2nd Congressional District and is part of New Jersey's 3rd state legislative district.

 

Salem County is governed by a five-member Board of County Commissioners who are elected at-large to serve three-year terms of office on a staggered basis, with either one or two seats coming up for election each year. At an annual reorganization meeting held in the beginning of January, the board selects a Director and a Deputy Director from among its members. , Salem County's Commissioners (with party, residence and term-end year listed in parentheses) are 
Director Benjamin H. Laury (R, Elmer, term as commissioner ends December 31, 2024; term as director ends 2022), 
Deputy Director Gordon J. "Mickey" Ostrum, Jr. (R, Pilesgrove Township, term as commissioner ends 2024; term as deputy director ends 2022),  
R. Scott Griscom (R, Mannington Township, 2022), 
Edward A. Ramsay (R, Pittsgrove Township, 2023) and
Lee R. Ware (D, Elsinboro Township, 2022). Constitutional officers elected on a countywide basis are 
County Clerk Dale A. Cross (R, 2024),
Sheriff Charles M. Miller (R, 2024) and 
Surrogate Nicki A. Burke (D, 2023).

Politics
As of March 2011, there were a total of 2,697 registered voters in Penns Grove, of which 1,482 (54.9% vs. 30.6% countywide) were registered as Democrats, 170 (6.3% vs. 21.0%) were registered as Republicans and 1,045 (38.7% vs. 48.4%) were registered as Unaffiliated. There were no voters registered to other parties. Among the borough's 2010 Census population, 52.4% (vs. 64.6% in Salem County) were registered to vote, including 77.4% of those ages 18 and over (vs. 84.4% countywide).

In the 2012 presidential election, Democrat Barack Obama received 81.6% of the vote (1,234 cast), ahead of Republican Mitt Romney with 17.5% (265 votes), and other candidates with 0.9% (13 votes), among the 1,524 ballots cast by the borough's 2,902 registered voters (12 ballots were spoiled), for a turnout of 52.5%. In the 2008 presidential election, Democrat Barack Obama received 1,349 votes (76.0% vs. 50.4% countywide), ahead of Republican John McCain with 314 votes (17.7% vs. 46.6%) and other candidates with 13 votes (0.7% vs. 1.6%), among the 1,774 ballots cast by the borough's 3,108 registered voters, for a turnout of 57.1% (vs. 71.8% in Salem County). In the 2004 presidential election, Democrat John Kerry received 1,003 votes (68.0% vs. 45.9% countywide), ahead of Republican George W. Bush with 444 votes (30.1% vs. 52.5%) and other candidates with 14 votes (0.9% vs. 1.0%), among the 1,474 ballots cast by the borough's 2,671 registered voters, for a turnout of 55.2% (vs. 71.0% in the whole county).

In the 2013 gubernatorial election, Democrat Barbara Buono received 51.4% of the vote (414 cast), ahead of Republican Chris Christie with 44.3% (357 votes), and other candidates with 4.2% (34 votes), among the 915 ballots cast by the borough's 2,793 registered voters (110 ballots were spoiled), for a turnout of 32.8%. In the 2009 gubernatorial election, Democrat Jon Corzine received 491 ballots cast (58.2% vs. 39.9% countywide), ahead of Republican Chris Christie with 205 votes (24.3% vs. 46.1%), Independent Chris Daggett with 56 votes (6.6% vs. 9.7%) and other candidates with 40 votes (4.7% vs. 2.0%), among the 844 ballots cast by the borough's 3,009 registered voters, yielding a 28.0% turnout (vs. 47.3% in the county).

Education
Students in public school for kindergarten through twelfth grade attend the Penns Grove-Carneys Point Regional School District, together with students from Carneys Point Township. As of the 2018–19 school year, the district, comprised of five schools, had an enrollment of 2,185 students and 182.0 classroom teachers (on an FTE basis), for a student–teacher ratio of 12.0:1. Schools in the district (with 2018–19 enrollment data from the National Center for Education Statistics) are 
Lafayette-Pershing School with 331 students in grades Pre-K to Kindergarten, 
Field Street School with 480 students in grades 1–3, 
Paul W. Carleton School with 355 students in grades 4–5, 
Penns Grove Middle School with 465 students in grades 6–8 and 
Penns Grove High School with 508 students in grades 9–12.

A majority of students in ninth through twelfth grades from Oldmans Township, New Jersey attend the district's high school as part of a sending/receiving relationship with the Oldmans Township School District, with the balance attending Woodstown High School in the Woodstown-Pilesgrove Regional School District.

The Catholic K–8 school St. James Elementary School of the Roman Catholic Diocese of Camden closed in 2000, with students redirected to Bishop Guilfoyle Regional Catholic School in Carneys Point, which in turn closed in 2010.  Guardian Angels Regional School is a K-8 school that operates under the auspices of the Diocese of Camden and accepts students from Penns Grove. Its PreK-3 campus is in Gibbstown while its 4-8 campus is in Paulsboro.

Transportation

Roads and highways

U.S. Route 130 (locally called Virginia Avenue) and Route 48 (starting at its western terminus and called Main Street within Penns Grove) both pass through the borough.

Public transportation
NJ Transit provides bus service between the borough and Philadelphia on the 402 route and to Woodstown on the 468 route.

Notable people

People who were born in, residents of, or otherwise closely associated with Penns Grove include:
 Kenneth A. Black Jr. (1932–2019), politician who served in the New Jersey General Assembly from District 3A from 1968 to 1974
 Don Bragg (1935–2019), Gold medal winner in the pole vault at the 1960 Summer Olympics held in Rome, Italy
 Roy Elsh (1892–1978), professional baseball player
 John Forsythe (1918–2010), television and character actor
 Paul Foster (1931-2021), playwright
 Ernest Martin Hennings (1888–1956), landscape and portrait painter who was a member of the Taos Society of Artists
 Dave Romansky (born 1938), competitive racewalker who represented the United States at the 1968 Summer Olympics
 Bruce Willis (born 1955), actor, moved to Penns Grove as child and graduated from Penns Grove High School

References

External links

 Penns Grove official website
 Penns Grove – Carneys Point Regional School District
 
 School Data for the Penns Grove – Carneys Point Regional School District, National Center for Education Statistics

 
1894 establishments in New Jersey
Borough form of New Jersey government
Boroughs in Salem County, New Jersey
Populated places established in 1894
New Jersey populated places on the Delaware River